21 is the 21st studio album by German heavy metal band Rage, released on 24 February 2012 through Nuclear Blast Records. The production was once again helmed by Charlie Bauerfeind, who had worked with the band for at least 10 years at that point.

Track listing

Bonus CD – Live in Tokyo 
Recorded live at Shibuya O-East, Tokyo, 15–16 April 2010.

Personnel

Band members 
 Peter "Peavy" Wagner – vocals, bass
 Victor Smolski – guitar
 André Hilgers – drums

Additional musicians 
 Hacky Hackmann – backing vocals

Production 
Charlie Bauerfeind – producer, engineering, mixing, mastering
Victor Smolski – producer, mixing, mastering
Heather Smith – engineering
Thomas Geiger – additional digital editing
Felipe Machado Franco – cover art, layout
Pia Kintrup – photography

References 

2012 albums
Rage (German band) albums
Nuclear Blast albums
Albums produced by Charlie Bauerfeind